The Best American Short Stories 2008, a volume in The Best American Short Stories series, was edited by Heidi Pitlor and by guest editor Salman Rushdie.

Short Stories included

Other notable stories

In his introduction to the volume, Rushdie named several other writers whom he said that he was "sad to have left out" including Andre Aciman, David Foster Wallace, Rick DeMarinis, Beverly Jensen, Erin Soros, Shena McAuliffe, Brendan Mathews and Andrew Sean Greer.  Among the other notable writers whose stories were among the "100 Other Distinguished Stories of 2007" were Daniel Alarcón, Jacob Appel, John Barth, Stuart Dybek, Mary Gordon, Marjorie Kemper, Stephen King, Molly McNett, Antonya Nelson, Jim Shepard, Melanie Rae Thon and John Updike.

Notes

2008 anthologies
Fiction anthologies
Short Stories 2008
Houghton Mifflin books